Schrenk (or Schrenck) is a surname. It may refer to:


Schrenk
Alexander von Schrenk (1816–1876), Baltic-German naturalist; brother of Leopold von Schrenck
Alois Josef, Freiherr von Schrenk (1802–1849), Roman Catholic archbishop of Prague
Matthew H. Schrenk (1902–1985), Scientist (Development of Radar), Naval Research Laboratory
Steve Schrenk (born 1968), U.S. baseball pitcher

Schrenck
Albert von Schrenck-Notzing (1862–1929), German physician, psychiatrist, and psychic researcher
Leopold von Schrenck (1826–1894), Russian-born Baltic-German zoologist, geographer, and ethnographer; brother of Alexander von Schrenk